The Church of Saints Peter and Paul is a Roman Catholic parish church under the authority of the Roman Catholic Archdiocese of New York, located at 833 St. Ann's Avenue, Bronx, New York City. The parish was established in 1897.

According to Bronx Catholic, the church dates from 1932. The architect was Robert J. Reiley.

It is one of the parishes in the Bronx that is home to communities of the Neocatechumenal Way.

References 

Religious organizations established in 1897
Roman Catholic churches in the Bronx